In enzymology, a 3-dehydro-L-gulonate 2-dehydrogenase is an enzyme that catalyzes the chemical reaction:

3-dehydro-L-gulonate + NAD(P)+  (4R,5S)-4,5,6-trihydroxy-2,3-dioxohexanoate + NAD(P)H + H+

The 3 substrates of this enzyme are 3-dehydro-L-gulonate, NAD+, and NADP+, whereas its 4 products are (4R,5S)-4,5,6-trihydroxy-2,3-dioxohexanoate, NADH, NADPH, and H+.

This enzyme belongs to the family of oxidoreductases, specifically those acting on the CH-OH group of donor with NAD+ or NADP+ as acceptor. The systematic name of this enzyme class is 3-dehydro-L-gulonate:NAD(P)+ 2-oxidoreductase. Other names in common use include 3-keto-L-gulonate dehydrogenase, 3-ketogulonate dehydrogenase, 3-keto-L-gulonate dehydrogenase, and 3-ketogulonate dehydrogenase. This enzyme participates in pentose and glucuronate interconversions and ascorbate and aldarate metabolism.

References 

 

EC 1.1.1
NADPH-dependent enzymes
NADH-dependent enzymes
Enzymes of known structure